The 1983 SANFL Grand Final was an Australian rules football competition.  beat  142 to 108.

Teams

Scorecard

References 

SANFL Grand Finals
SANFL Grand Final, 1983